Takuya Ito may refer to:
Takuya Ito (footballer, born 1974) (伊藤 琢矢) - Japanese footballer
Takuya Ito (footballer, born 1976) (伊藤 卓弥) - Japanese footballer